Industry station is a Metrolink train station located at 600 South Brea Canyon Road in Industry, California. Metrolink's Riverside Line trains between Los Angeles Union Station and Riverside–Downtown station stop here.  It is owned and operated by the City of Industry.

In 2011, the Industry station had the highest ridership on the Riverside line, averaging 1,378 daily boardings, representing 34.5% of all boardings for the Riverside line.

History 
The City of Industry station opened on June 14, 1993, and built at a cost of $2.4 million. In 1994, the Riverside line, which then ran from downtown Los Angeles to the Industry station, had Metrolink's highest ridership per week, averaging 2,000 passengers. In 2012, 8,000 solar panels were installed to cover 940 parking spaces in an $11 million project that generates  of electricity per hour. The project also included the installation of 64 electric car charging stations. Most of the funding came from Proposition 1A, although the South Coast Air Quality Management District also provided a $2 million grant.

References

External links 

Metrolink stations in Los Angeles County, California
Railway stations in the United States opened in 1993